Gurcharan Singh Galib is an Indian politician.  He was elected to the Lok Sabha, the lower house of the Parliament of India as a member of the Indian National Congress.

References

External links
Official biographical sketch in Parliament of India website

1933 births
Lok Sabha members from Punjab, India
India MPs 1999–2004
Indian National Congress politicians
Living people
Shiromani Akali Dal politicians